"Far Nearer" / "Beat For" is the debut solo single of English producer Jamie xx, who rose to fame as being a member of the indie pop band the xx. The double A-side single was released on 6 June 2011 through Numbers, part XL Recordings.

Composition
The single features two songs, "Far Nearer", a downtempo song with steel pan drums and Caribbean rhythms and tones, and "Beat For", a post-dubstep song with pitch shifted, distorted vocals and a heavy bassline.

Reception
The single received positive reception upon release. Larry Fitzmaurice of Pitchfork Media named the track "Far Nearer" as "Best New Track" for the week of 6 June 2011. Reviewing the single, Fitzmaurice said: 

The single reached a peak of No. 128 on the UK Singles Chart.

Track listing
All songs written and produced by Jamie Smith.

Chart positions

References

External links 
 
 "Far Nearer" and "Beat For" audio on YouTube.

2011 songs
2011 debut singles
Jamie xx songs
Song recordings produced by Jamie xx
XL Recordings singles